Crush 'Em All Vol. 1 is a split EP by hardcore punk bands Boysetsfire and Shai Hulud, released on March 24, 2000, on Undecided Records, 7" purple (25 press), grey (475 press), clear red (500 press), and Detroit Fest press black (#'d out of 300). The Shai Hulud cover song "Damage, Inc." was included in A Profound Hatred of Man (reissue). Shai Hulud and Boysetsfire each cover a Metallica song. This 7" is the first record of the ongoing series of Metallica tribute records. Steve Kleisath returned to play drums for Shai Hulud on this recording.

Track listing
 "Fade to Black" (Boysetsfire)
 "Damage, Inc."  (Shai Hulud)

Credits

Shai Hulud line-up
Jared Allen - bass guitar
Matt Fletcher - guitar
Matt Fox - guitar
Steve Kleisath - drums
Geert van der Velde - voice

Boysetsfire albums
2000 EPs
Split EPs
Shai Hulud albums
Undecided Records EPs
Albums produced by Jeremy Staska